King George Hospital may refer to:

 King George Hospital, London, London Borough of Redbridge, England
 King George's Hospital, Lucknow, Lucknow,  Uttar Pradesh, India
 King George V Memorial Hospital, Sydney, New South Wales, Australia
 King George Hospital, Visakhapatnam, Visakhapatnam, Andhra Pradesh, India